The 2011–12 Championnat de France amateur season was the 14th since its establishment. Gazélec Ajaccio was the previous season's club champions, while the reserve team of professional club Lyon were the defending reserve team champions. The teams and groups was announced on 18 July 2011 and the fixtures were determined on 28 July. The season began on 13 August 2011 and ended on 2 June 2012. The winter break was in effect from 23 December to 6 January.

Teams 

There were ten promoted teams from the Championnat de France amateur 2, replacing the 12 teams that were relegated from the Championnat de France amateur following the 2010–11 season. A total of 72 teams competed in the league with seven clubs suffering relegation to the fifth division, the Championnat de France amateur 2. All non-reserve clubs that secured league status for the season were subject to approval by the DNCG before becoming eligible to participate in the competition.

Promotion and relegation 

Teams relegated to Championnat de France amateur
 Alfortville
 Bayonne
 Plabennec
 Rodez

Teams promoted to Championnat de France amateur
 AC Amiens
 Bordeaux B
 Concarneau
 Dunkerque
 Marseille Consolat
 Mont-de-Marsan
 Pontivy
 Sarre-Union
 Saumur
 Valenciennes B

DNCG rulings 

On 26 May 2011, following a preliminary review of each club's administrative and financial accounts in the Championnat National, the DNCG ruled that Pacy Vallée-d'Eure, Strasbourg, Gap, Grenoble, and Cannes would be relegated to the Championnat de France amateur (CFA) after the organization determined that the clubs were enduring financial difficulties. The organization also excluded Toulon from participating in the CFA and relegated both Agde and Chambéry to the fifth division. On 4 June, the DNCG announced that, for the second consecutive season, Calais would not be allowed to ascend to the CFA. All clubs had the option to appeal the rulings.

On 24 June 2011, Pacy Vallée-d'Eure officials confirmed in a press conference that it would accept its relegation to the fourth division in an effort to smooth over its €350,000 debt into next year. Two weeks later, on 4 July, Grenoble confirmed on its website that the Appeals Board of the DNCG had informed club officials that it will be relegated to the fourth division.  Grenoble, subsequently, entered liquidation on 7 July, which made the club unable to participate in the CFA. On the same day as the Grenoble ruling, the DNCG also rejected the appeals of Toulon and Calais. On 8 July 2011, the Appeals Board of the DNCG confirmed that both Strasbourg and Gap would remain relegated after the clubs failed to convince the board of its intent to fix its financial liabilities. Strasbourg has a deficit of over €4 million, while Gap's debt has exceeded over €80,000. Following the appeal denial, Gap officials announced that the club would appeal to the CNOSF, the National Sporting Committee of France. On 13 July, Agde successfully appealed to the DNCG and was, subsequently, re-instated into the CFA, while Chambéry had its appeal rejected.

On 19 July, Cannes had its appeal to remain in the Championnat National rejected by the DNCG. Similar to Gap, following the decision, Cannes announced its intent to appeal the ruling at the CNOSF. On 29 July, the CNOSF gave a favorable ruling for Cannes recommending to the federation that Cannes should remain in the third division. On 3 August, the CNOSF confirmed the demotion of Gap to the Championnat de France amateur.  The French Football Federation determined whether Cannes would be allowed to participate in the league on 4 August, one day before the season was set to begin at the federation's annual executive meeting. At the meeting, the Federation re-affirmed its decision to relegate Cannes to the CFA stating it "trust the DNCG and followed its decisions". On 24 August, the Executive Committee of the French Football Federation announced that RC Strasbourg would be relegated to the CFA 2 after a Strasbourg tribunal ordered the club to enter liquidation. No club was named in Strasbourg's place, which left Group B with 17 clubs.

League tables

Group A

Results

Group B

Results

Group C

Results

Group D

Results

Top goalscorers

Notes

References

External links 
 Official site
 Standings and statistics 

 

4
Fra
2011